Banksia penicillata is a species of shrub that is endemic to a restricted area of New South Wales. It has smooth bark, serrated, elliptic to egg-shaped leaves, green to bluish flower buds, later yellow flowers in a cylindrical spike, and later still, up to one hundred narrow elliptical follicles in each spike, surrounded by the remains of the flowers.

Description
The sides of the leaves are serrated or lobed and the lower surface is covered with woolly white hairs.

Taxonomy and naming
Banksia conferta was first formally described in 1981 by Alex George in the journal Nuytsia. In the same publication he described two varieties, conferta and penicillata. In 1996, George raised the variety penicillata to subspecies - B. conferta subsp. penicillata, at the same time creating the autonym B. conferta subsp. conferta. In the same year (1996), Kevin Thiele and Pauline Ladiges raised subspecies penicillata to species status as B. penicillata in Australian Systematic Botany, based on the differences in habit, bark, leaf shape, indumentum and flower colour, and the fact that the two taxa were so far from each other. According to their morphological cladistic analysis, B. penicillata was sister taxon to B. paludosa. In the same paper, the authors noted that the adult leaves of B. penicillata and B. paludosa have toothed margins, but B. conferta has entire margins. The change is accepted by the Australian Plant Census. The specific epithet (penicillata) is from the Latin word penicillatus, meaning "like an artist's camel-hair brush. A 2013 molecular study by Marcel Cardillo and colleagues using chloroplast DNA and combining it with earlier results placed B. penicillata as a part of a lineage that gave rise to the three subspecies of B. integrifolia.

Distribution and habitat

Banksia penicillata grows on and near rocky sandstone cliffs in forest and woodland in a few locations in the Blue Mountains west of Sydney.

Ecology
This banksia does not have a lignotuber but the follicles remain closed until burnt in a bushfire. The plant is killed by fire but regenerates from seed.

References

penicillata
Flora of New South Wales
Plants described in 1981
Taxa named by Alex George